In international law, the Prevention of Disasters Principle, as first elaborated in the Agenda arising from the United Nations Habitat II conference, permits states to take pre-emptive or restraining actions when a consensus of scientific opinion is that failing to do so will cause some disaster to occur.  See also the Precautionary Principle.

International law